European exceptionalism may refer to:
a description of European dominance in 18th and 19th century history, see European miracle
ideological attempts to account for this dominance, see  Eurocentrism

See also
Exceptionalism